Santa María de Huerta is a municipality located in the Campo de Gómara comarca, Province of Soria, Castile and León, Spain beside the A2 autopista and close to the border with Aragon. According to the 2004 census (INE), the municipality has a population of 419 inhabitants.

The village contains the Cistercian monastery of Santa María de Huerta.

References

Municipalities in the Province of Soria